The Laurentian Divide also called the Northern Divide and locally the height of land, is  a continental divide in central North America that separates the Hudson Bay watershed to the north from the Gulf of Mexico watershed to the south and the Great Lakes-St. Lawrence watershed to the southeast.

Water north of the divide flows to Hudson Bay; water south of the divide and also south of the St. Lawrence Divide flows to the Gulf of Mexico, otherwise to the Labrador Sea or via the Great Lakes and St. Lawrence Seaway to the Gulf of St. Lawrence. 

From the divide's junction with the Continental Divide at Triple Divide Peak, just south of the U.S. border in northwestern Montana, it runs north to just across the border then east through southern Alberta and Saskatchewan where it turns southeasterly reentering the U.S. at the northwestern corner of North Dakota. It then continues on to the extreme northeast corner of South Dakota before crossing the middle of Minnesota's western border at the Traverse Gap. The divide then runs north and east through northern Minnesota, through Superior National Forest in the eastern tip, into Ontario. There it passes to the north of Lake Nipigon, then runs as far south as the 48th parallel before veering north again to cross the western border of Quebec just south of Lake Abitibi. It then meanders northeasterly across Quebec to the southwestern boundary of Labrador. From there, it follows the boundary jaggedly north to Killiniq Island where it becomes the boundary between Nunavut and Labrador before reaching its terminus at Cape Chidley on the Labrador Sea.

Two triple divide points lie on the divide. One is at its origin on Triple Divide Peak, in Glacier National Park, Montana, where it meets the Continental Divide; this is usually considered the hydrological apex of North America. That peak divides the waters of the Columbia River watershed which flow to the Pacific Ocean from the waters of the Nelson River watershed which flow to Hudson Bay and the Mississippi River watershed which flows to the Gulf of Mexico. The other triple divide is at Hill of Three Waters near Hibbing, Minnesota, which is the junction with the St. Lawrence divide.  This not a summit, but a highland plains where the watersheds of the Mississippi, Nelson and St. Lawrence River (which flows to the Gulf of St. Lawrence) meet.

The eastern portion of the divide marked the original northern boundary of both Ontario and Quebec provinces at the time of Confederation in 1867, although both have since expanded significantly northward. West of Lake Superior, the divide formed the northern boundary of the United States' Louisiana Purchase in 1803.

See also
Canadian shield or Laurentian Plateau
Laurentia
Grenville Orogeny
Torngat Mountains of the Arctic Cordillera

References

External links
  (Minnesota portion)

Geography of North America
Drainage divides
Drainage basins of North America